Edward Harvie Ward, Jr. (December 8, 1925 – September 4, 2004) was an American golfer best known for his amateur career. He is best known for winning both the U.S. Amateur (twice) and the British Amateur.

Born in Tarboro, North Carolina, Ward attended the University of North Carolina in Chapel Hill. As a Tar Heel, he won the NCAA Division I individual title in 1949, and graduated with a degree in economics.

Ward's win in the British Amateur came in 1952 (he finished runner-up in 1953), and his consecutive U.S. Amateur wins came in 1955 and 1956. He also won several other significant amateur events including the Canadian Amateur, making him one of two golfers to win the U.S., British, and Canadian Amateurs (the other is Dick Chapman). Ward is the only player in history to have won those three titles along with the NCAA Championship. He finished runner-up in the 1952 Western Amateur. He also won the 1977 North Carolina Open as a professional.

Ward played on three winning Walker Cup teams (1953, 1955, 1959), winning all six of his matches.

In 1957, Ward lost his amateur status, in a controversial ruling by the United States Golf Association, for accepting expense money from sponsors for golf tournaments. The ruling was reversed in 1958. His primary sponsor, Eddie Lowery, who was serving at the time on the USGA's Executive Committee, had incorrectly claimed income tax deductions for the money he was spending to sponsor Ward, one of his car dealership employees in the San Francisco area. Ward was unaware of this situation, and was not personally at fault. Following the ruling, Ward's life went into a tailspin, and he took several years to recover.

Ward played in 19 professional majors. In 11 Masters Tournament appearances, he finished in the top 10 twice (4th in 1957 and tied for 8th in 1955), in the top 25 five times, and only missed two cuts. In the U.S. Open, he made the cut in five of eight appearances, including a tie for 7th in 1955.

Ward turned professional in 1974, and became a club professional and golf instructor. His best-known student was three-time major winner Payne Stewart. He worked at Foxfire Country Club, Grand Cypress Golf Club (Orlando, Florida), Interlachen Golf Club (Winter Park, Florida) and Pine Needles Lodge & Golf Club (Southern Pines, North Carolina). He played occasionally on the Senior PGA Tour from 1980 to 1990.

Ward was inducted into the North Carolina Sports Hall of Fame in 1965, the Carolinas Golf Reporters Association - Carolinas Golf Hall of Fame in 1981, and the Carolinas PGA Hall of Fame in 1996.

Amateur wins
1948 North and South Amateur
1949 NCAA Division I Championship, Carolinas Amateur, Tournament of Golf Champions
1952 British Amateur, Dogwood Invitational
1953 Dogwood Invitational
1954 Canadian Amateur
1955 U.S. Amateur, San Francisco City Championship
1956 U.S. Amateur

Professional wins
1977 North Carolina Open

Major championships

Amateur wins (3)

Results timeline

Note: Ward never played in The Open Championship or the PGA Championship.

LA = low amateur
CUT = missed the half-way cut
R128, R64, R32, R16, QF, SF = round in which player lost in match play
"T" indicates a tie for a place

Sources: Masters, U.S. Open and U.S. Amateur

U.S. national team appearances
Amateur
Walker Cup: 1953 (winners), 1955 (winners), 1959 (winners)
Americas Cup: 1952 (winners), 1954 (winners), 1956 (winners), 1958 (winners)

References

External links
Obituary

American male golfers
Amateur golfers
North Carolina Tar Heels men's golfers
PGA Tour Champions golfers
Golfers from North Carolina
People from Tarboro, North Carolina
People from Pinehurst, North Carolina
1925 births
2004 deaths